Avià is a municipality in the comarca of Berguedà, in Catalonia. Its population in 2007 was 2108 inhabitants.

The municipality is made up of three towns: Avià, Graugés and La Plana.
Its economical activity is based on agriculture and textile industry. In 2010 the population of the town was 2223.

The mayor is Patrocini Canal Burniol.

Landmarks
 Church of Sant Vicenç d'Obiols. Pre-Romanesque
 Church of Santa Maria d'Avià. Romanesque
 Serrat dels Lladres (Avià).
 Serradet del Bullidor.
 Sant Martí d'Avià, the parish church in Plaça del Ateneu, also known as Plaça del Secretari.

References

External links
Official website 
 Government data pages 

Municipalities in Berguedà
Populated places in Berguedà